Täby FK is a Swedish football club based in Täby, Stockholm.

History
The club was founded in 2012 when the football sections of Täby IS and IFK Täby merged. In 2019 they won Division 2 Norra Svealand and gained promotion to Division 1, the third highest league, where they will be playing in 2020.
During the 2020/21 season, the club reached its highest position ever 11th in Division 1 Norra with a young and talented squad where the oldest player was their captain at 23 years old.

Season to season
{| 
|valign="top" width=0%|

References

External links
 Täby FK – official website

Football clubs in Stockholm County
Association football clubs established in 2012
2012 establishments in Sweden